Jan Hošek (born 1 April 1989 in Klatovy) is a Czech football player.

Career

Club
Hošek began his career 1994 with TJ Okula Nýrsko after eight years with the club, signed than with TJ Klatovy in 2002. He played here three years and signed than in 2005 with SK Slavia Praha who played on youth side. In January 2009 was promoted to the first team SK Slavia Praha who plays in the Gambrinus liga and played his first game on 23 February 2009 against FC Viktoria Plzeň.

In August 2011, he was loaned to Polish club Cracovia on a one-year deal.

International
He was member of the Czech under-21 team. He represented the team at the 2011 UEFA European Under-21 Football Championship.

References

External links
 
 
 Jan Hošek at SK Slavia Prague 
 
 

1989 births
Living people
Czech footballers
Czech expatriate footballers
Czech Republic youth international footballers
Czech Republic under-21 international footballers
Czech National Football League players
Czech First League players
Ekstraklasa players
SK Slavia Prague players
FK Teplice players
MKS Cracovia (football) players
FK Baník Sokolov players
MFK Karviná players
SFC Opava players
Expatriate footballers in Poland
Czech expatriate sportspeople in Poland
Association football defenders
People from Klatovy
Sportspeople from the Plzeň Region